Ellen F. Rosenblum (born January 6, 1951) is an American lawyer and politician who has served as the Oregon Attorney General since 2012. She is the first female state attorney general in Oregon's history, and previously was a judge on the Oregon Court of Appeals from 2005 to 2011.

Early life
Rosenblum was born in Berkeley, California, one of eight children of Jewish parents Victor and Louise Rosenblum. The family moved to Evanston, Illinois, where her father was a law professor at Northwestern University for 40 years; he was also president of Reed College from 1968 to 1970.  She graduated from Evanston Township High School and attended Scripps College before earning her undergraduate degree from the University of Oregon in 1971, where she also earned a J.D. degree in 1975.

Law and judicial career
In 1975, Rosenblum became an associate at the Eugene law firm of Hammons, Phillips and Jensen, and later became a partner in the firm. In 1980, she became an Assistant U.S. Attorney for the District of Oregon, specializing in financial crimes. In 1989, she was appointed by Governor Neil Goldschmidt as a judge to the Multnomah County District Court where she presided until 1993, when Governor Barbara Roberts appointed her as a judge on the Multnomah County Circuit Court. In 2005, Governor Ted Kulongoski appointed her to fill a vacancy on the Oregon Court of Appeals, and she was elected to a full six-year term in 2006, and retired as a judge in May 2011.

Attorney General
After Attorney General John Kroger decided not to seek another term, Rosenblum in January 2012 started her campaign for the Democratic nomination for the position. U.S. Attorney Dwight Holton also entered the race, and held an early fundraising advantage with the support of most of the state's law enforcement community. Rosenblum focused on social issues, and when Holton criticized the Oregon Medical Marijuana Act, Rosenblum gained the support of Oregon marijuana legalization supporters by pledging to "make marijuana enforcement a low priority, and protect the rights of medical marijuana patients." In the May Democratic primary, she went on to defeat Holton by nearly 30 percentage points to move on to the general election.

In 2012, Kroger announced his resignation effective June 29, 2012 to become President of Reed College,  and Governor John Kitzhaber named Rosenblum to replace Kroger effective that same day. Coincidentally, Rosenblum's father, Victor Rosenblum, had served as President of Reed from 1968 to 1970. Rosenblum became Oregon's first female Attorney General. She served in the appointed position until January and won the general election in November for a full term. Though no Republican filed in the primary, Portland attorney James Buchal received enough write-in votes to qualify for the November ballot as a Republican.

Rosenblum was re-elected to another term as Attorney General in November 2016, defeating Republican candidate Daniel Crowe.

In July 2020, Rosenblum filed a lawsuit against the federal government, accusing it of unlawfully detaining protesters, after footage emerged of agents in unmarked vehicles (but not unmarked police officers) appearing to forcefully seize protesters.

Personal
Rosenblum is married to Richard Meeker, until 2015 publisher and co-owner of the Willamette Week newspaper in Portland. The couple have two adult children.

Electoral history

See also
List of female state attorneys general in the United States

References

External links

Government website
Campaign website

1951 births
21st-century American politicians
21st-century American women politicians
American women judges
Jewish American people in Oregon politics
Jewish women politicians
Lawyers from Eugene, Oregon
Lawyers from Portland, Oregon
Living people
Oregon Attorneys General
Oregon Court of Appeals judges
Oregon Democrats
People from Evanston, Illinois
Politicians from Berkeley, California
Politicians from Eugene, Oregon
Scripps College alumni
University of Oregon School of Law alumni
Women in Oregon politics